Li Ling (born 12 June 1948) is a Chinese historian and archaeologist.

Biography
Li Ling was born in Xingtai, Hebei in 1948. His original family home was located in Wuxiang County, Shanxi, and Ling grew up in Beijing. He worked in Shanxi and Inner Mongolia for 7 years as a sent-down youth after graduation from high school.

He came back to Beijing in 1975, and was enrolled into the Institute of Archaeology (IA) of the Chinese Academy of Sciences (the institute later became part of the Chinese Academy of Social Sciences, CASS), working on the research of inscriptions on bronze under the supervision of Zhang Zhengliang. He graduated with a master's degree in History in 1982.

He joined the Bangxi Branch of Archaeological Team of IA CASS between 1982 and 1983. In the Research Center for Agricultural Economy, Chinese Academy of Social Sciences, he researched the history of pre-Qin agricultural institutions. Since 1985 he has been professor of Department of Chinese Language and Literature, Peking University.

Works
Li Ling's research and teaching concentrate on bamboo and silk manuscripts, The Art of War, Fangshu, Zuo zhuan, and the history of ancient China.

His major academic works include:

Research on the ancient manuscript of The Art of War, Peking University Press 1995 (《孙子古本研究》,北京大学出版社 1995) .
Research on Sun Tzu of Wu, China Book Press 1997. (《吴孙子发微》,中华书局 1997) .
Research on China Fangshu, Oriental Press 2000. (《中国方术考》,东方出版社 2000) .
Research on China Fangshu Vol. II, Oriental Press 2000. (《中国方术续考》，东方出版社 2000) .
Research on Guodian Chu Slips, Peking University Press 2002. (《郭店楚简校读记》，北京大学出版社 2002) .

External links
Department of Chinese Language and Literature,Peking University

Chinese sinologists
1948 births
Living people
People's Republic of China historians
Chinese archaeologists
Academic staff of Peking University
People from Xingtai
Educators from Hebei
Historians from Hebei
Chinese epigraphers
20th-century Chinese historians
21st-century Chinese historians